is an important Shinto sanctuary in the Shimogamo district of Kyoto city's Sakyō ward. It is one of the oldest Shinto shrines in Japan and is one of the seventeen Historic Monuments of Ancient Kyoto which have been designated by UNESCO as a World Heritage Site. The term Kamo-jinja in Japanese is a general reference to Shimogamo Shrine and Kamigamo Shrine, the traditionally linked Kamo shrines of Kyoto; Shimogamo is the older of the pair, being believed to be 100 years older than Kamigamo, and dating to the 6th century, centuries before Kyoto became the capital of Japan (794, see Heian-kyō). The Kamo-jinja serve the function of protecting Kyoto from malign influences.

The jinja name identifies the Kamo family of kami or deities who are venerated. The name also refers to the ambit of shrine's nearby woods, which are vestiges of the primeval forest of Tadasu no Mori. In addition, the shrine name references the area's early inhabitants, the Kamo clan, many of whom continue to live near the shrine their ancestors traditionally served.

Kamigamo Shrine, the other of the two Kamo shrines of Kyoto, is dedicated to Kamo Wakeikazuchi. These kami are variously associated with thunder.

History
The shrine became the object of Imperial patronage during the early Heian period. 
Shimogamo, along with the Kamigamo Shrine, was designated as one of two chief Shinto shrines (ichinomiya) for the former Yamashiro Province.
In 965, Emperor Murakami ordered that Imperial messengers were sent to report important events to Japan's guardian kami, including Kamo-Tamayori-hime and Kamo-Taketsune. 
The writer of Hōjōki,　was the second son of one of the head priests of the shrine,  .
Today, it is one of the most visited sites during the new year, and the popular national pastime game of kemari is often played by Shinto priests.

Imperial visits
 794 (Enryaku 13): Emperor Kanmu came as part of a grand progress.
 942 (Tengyō 5, 29th day of the 4th month): Emperor Suzaku visited to offer thanks for restoration of peace.
 979 (Tengen 2, 10th day of the 10th month):  Emperor En'yū decided that an Imperial visit Hachiman at Iwashimizu Shrine should be paired with a visit to Kamo.
 1088 (Kanji 27th day of the 4th month): Emperor Horikawa visited Kamo.
 1156 (Hōgen 1, 23rd day of the 4th month): Emperor Go-Shirakawa traveled to Kamo.

Structures
A shrine structure was erected in 678 during the reign of the Emperor Tenmu, and this became the principal building during the reign or of the Emperor Kanmu when he removed the capital from Nara to Heian-kyō.

Shimogamo Shrine (Lower Kamo Shrine) is believed to date to the 6th century.

A model of the Hut described in Hōjōki is located in Kawai Jinja section of the shrine.

Gallery

See also
 List of Shinto shrines
 Twenty-Two Shrines
 Modern system of ranked Shinto shrines
 Mitarashi dango
Kanpei-taisha

Notes

References

 Breen, John and Mark Teeuwen. (2000).  Shinto in History: Ways of the Kami. Honolulu: University of Hawaii Press. 
 Iwao, Seiichi, Teizō Iyanaga, Susumu Ishii, Shōichirō Yoshida, et al. (2002).  Dictionnaire historique du Japon. Paris: Maisonneuve & Larose. ;  OCLC 51096469
 Nelson, John K. (2000).  Enduring Identities: The Guise of Shinto in Contemporary Japan. Honolulu: University of Hawaii Press. 
 Ponsonby-Fane, Richard. (1959).  The Imperial House of Japan. Kyoto: Ponsonby Memorial Society. OCLC 194887
 . (1962).   Studies in Shinto and Shrines. Kyoto: Ponsonby Memorial Society. OCLC 399449
 . (1964).  Visiting Famous Shrines in Japan. Kyoto: Ponsonby-Fane Memorial Society.

External links
 
 Shimogamo Shrine website 

Buildings and structures completed in the 6th century
Shinto shrines in Kyoto
World Heritage Sites in Japan
National Treasures of Japan
Important Cultural Properties of Japan
Historic Sites of Japan
   Beppyo shrines